Benoît Richaud (born 16 January 1988) is a French figure skating choreographer and former competitive ice dancer. He has competed at three World Junior Championships, placing as high as seventh. Richaud currently lives in Avignon, France, his hometown.

Choreographer career 
Following his sports retirement, Richaud has been working as a choreographer. Skaters he has choreographed for include Kaori Sakamoto, Mai Mihara, Bradie Tennell, Rika Kihira, Satoko Miyahara, Eva-Lotta Kiibus, Maé-Bérénice Méité, Ivett Tóth, Elizaveta Tuktamysheva, Lindsay van Zundert, Daisuke Takahashi, Denis Ten, Jeremy Abbott, Chafik Besseghier, Michal Březina, Daniel Grassl, Donovan Carrillo, and Deniss Vasiljevs as well as ice dance couples Alla Loboda/Pavel Drozd and Lucie Mysliveckova/Lukas Csolley.

Competitive career 
Richaud was a former student Boucher-Zazoui (a school in Lyon). He competed for France throughout his career. His first ice dancing partner was Scarlett Rouzet.

From 2005 to 2007, he skated with Élodie Brouiller. They competed at two World Junior Championships, placing 13th in 2006 and 7th in 2007. Brouiller/Richaud won two medals on the ISU Junior Grand Prix series and qualified for the JGP Final in 2006. They ended their partnership in 2007.

Subsequently, Richaud partnered with Canada's Terra Findlay in November 2007. During the 2008–2009 season, they placed 10th at the World Junior Championships. Their partnership concluded at the end of the season.

Results 
JGP: ISU Junior Grand Prix

With Findlay

With Brouiller

References

External links 

 Official website of Benoit Richaud
 
 

Figure skating choreographers
French male ice dancers
Living people
1988 births
Sportspeople from Avignon